INS Kardip is a forward operating base of the Indian Navy under the joint-services Andaman and Nicobar Command located on Kamorta Island in the Andaman and Nicobar Islands. It was commissioned in 1973.

History
After the 1962 Sino-Indian War, the Navy was tasked with the defence of the Andaman & Nicobar Islands. INS Jarawa was commissioned on Port Blair in 1964 as the main naval base in the islands.

By the early 1970s, it was evident that most unauthorized intrusions into the territorial waters of the islands by vessels of other nations were occurring in the southern Nicobar Islands. Given the distance of these islands from Port Blair, the navy decided to establish a forward operating base there to station and support large patrol craft. INS Kardip was hence commissioned in 1973 on Kamorta island. Ship maintenance facilities were established at INS Kardip soon thereafter.

See also
 Indian navy 
 List of Indian Navy bases
 List of active Indian Navy ships

 Integrated commands and units
 Armed Forces Special Operations Division
 Defence Cyber Agency
 Integrated Defence Staff
 Integrated Space Cell
 Indian Nuclear Command Authority
 Indian Armed Forces
 Special Forces of India

 Other lists
 Strategic Forces Command
 List of Indian Air Force stations
 List of Indian Navy bases
 India's overseas military bases

References

Kardip